Kujur may refer to:
 Kujur, Kerman
 Kujur, Mazandaran

People
Gangotri Kujur, Indian politician